2008 hurricane season may refer to: 

 the 2008 Atlantic hurricane season 
 the 2008 Pacific hurricane season

In sports:

 the 2008 season of the Miami Hurricanes football team